"Our Days" is the 8th single released by Japanese singer Ami Suzuki under label Sony Music Japan.

Information
The song was a huge success at the time of its release, debuting at number one in the Oricon charts, and being also one of the best-selling singles of Suzuki. The song "Our Days" was her second single that was written by Mitsuko Komuro, and also was used as the main theme of "Professional Style", a home product made by Kanebo. The maxi single included a clip of "Rain of Tears", a song of Suzuki that appeared on a Kodak TV Commercial called "Snap Kids".

Following her blacklisting from the music industry in September 2000, production and distribution of the single stopped in its entirety.

Track listing

Ami Suzuki songs
1999 singles
Oricon Weekly number-one singles
Songs written by Tetsuya Komuro
1999 songs